Bibek is a given name popular among Nepali, Bengali and Assamese speaking people. It is a regionalised form of Vivek, meaning "wisdom" in Sanskrit. Notable people with this name include the following:

Bibek Bhowmik, Indian footballer 
Bibek Debroy (born 1955), Indian economist and author
Bibek Diyali (born 1989), Indian cricketer
Bibek Maitra (1965–2006), Indian political appointee

See also

Bebek (surname)
Biber (surname)
Babek (disambiguation)
Bibel (disambiguation)

Indian masculine given names